The 2011 Rugby Super League season was be the sixteenth season of the Rugby Super League, the United States' premier division of rugby union. The regular season commenced March 12, 2011 with the Utah Warriors playing the Denver Barbarians. On April 30, 2011; the regular season ended, followed by the RSL playoffs, for which the top four clubs qualified. San Francisco Golden Gate won the playoffs and were crowned champions.  They also had the best regular season and repeated as premiers.

The defending champions were the New York Athletic Club, the defending premiers were the San Francisco Golden Gate.

Participating clubs

Standings

Red Conference

Blue Conference 

4 points awarded to the winning team
0 points to the losing team
2 points to each team in the case of a tie
1 bonus Point to a team scoring 4 or more tries
1 bonus Point to a losing team keeping the score within 7 points

Play-offs

External links 
 

Rugby Super League (United States)
USA
SUper